Senator  may refer to:

Damon Thayer (born 1967), Kentucky State Senate
Ebeneezer Thayer (1746–1809), Massachusetts State Senate
Francis S. Thayer (1822–1880), New York State Senate
John Milton Thayer (1820–1906), U.S. Senator from Nebraska
John R. Thayer (1845–1916), Massachusetts State Senate
Lyman Wellington Thayer (1854–1919), Wisconsin State Senate
Warren T. Thayer (1869–1956), New York State Senate